Thung Thoeng is a tambon (subdistrict) located in the westernmost region of Det Udom District, in Ubon Ratchathani Province, Thailand. In 2021, it had a population of 8,296 people. Neighbouring subdistricts are (clockwise from the south) Na Hom, Tha Khlo, Nong Kung, Khok Sawang, Na Krasaeng, and Nong Om.

History
Previously, the area was governed by Som Sa-at and Kaeng subdistricts. Later in 1961, Thung Thoeng legally gained subdistrict status by absorbing seven and six villages from Som Sa-at and Kaeng, respectively, to form a new administrative division.

In 1966, together with the area divided from Na Suang and Som Sa-at, the northeastern region of Thung Thoeng was split to form a new subdistrict, Na Charoen.

In 1969, the southeastern was additionally split off to create a new administrative division, Nong Om subdistrict, which was also divided into two in 1991 to creat a new tambon, Khok Chamrae. Both newly established subdistricts are currently gorverned by Thung Si Udom.

In 1992, Thung Thoeng subdistrict, along with Nong Om, Na Kasem, Kut Ruea, and Khok Chamrae, was separated from Det Udom, to form a new district, Thung Si Udom. But Thung Thoeng was later transferred back to the Det Udon district a year later. However, before the transfer, nine of its affiliated villages in the southern part were split off to create a new subdistrict, Na Hom, which is currently a tambon of Thung Si Udom district.

Administration
The tambon is divided into 14 administrative villages (mubans; หมู่บ้าน), one of which, Bua Charoen village, was further divided into two community groups (Mu; หมู่). The entire area is governed by the Subdistrict Administrative Organization of Thung Thoeng (องค์การบริหารส่วนตำบลทุ่งเทิง; Thung Thoeng SAO).

The following is a list of the subdistrict's mubans, which roughly correspond to the villages, as of the 2021 census.

References

Tambon of Ubon Ratchathani Province